Sir David Burnett, 1st Baronet (22 August 1851 – 7 July 1930) was a Lord Mayor of London. Knighted in 1908 and created Baronet Burnett, of Selborne House, in the Borough of Croydon in 1913, he was a surveyor and local politician active in the City of London.

A Fellow of the Surveyors Institute from 1881, he became a member of the Common Council of London representing Candlewick Ward in 1888, rising to be an alderman in 1902. He was Sheriff of the City of London in 1907-08, and Lord Mayor of London in 1912-13.

Family
He married Emily Sleap, daughter of Thomas Sleap, on 28 August 1875. The couple had six children.

See also
 Burnett baronets

References

Knights Bachelor
Baronets in the Baronetage of the United Kingdom
Lord mayors of London
1851 births
1930 deaths
Place of birth missing
Place of death missing